Calathus rubripes is a species of ground beetle from the Platyninae subfamily that can be found in Italy and Switzerland.

References

rubripes
Beetles described in 1831
Beetles of Europe